V. rubra  may refer to:
 Varecia rubra, the red ruffed lemur, a mammal species
 Vriesea rubra, a plant species native to Bolivia and Venezuela

See also
 Rubra (disambiguation)